The 2009–10 ISU Junior Grand Prix was the 13th season of the ISU Junior Grand Prix, a series of international junior level competitions organized by the International Skating Union. It was the Junior-level complement to the 2009–10 ISU Grand Prix of Figure Skating, which is for Senior-level skaters. Skaters competed in the disciplines of men's singles, ladies' singles, pair skating, and ice dance.

Skaters earned points towards qualification at each of the seven Junior Grand Prix events. The top eight skaters/teams in the series from each discipline met at the Junior Grand Prix Final, which was held concurrently with the senior Grand Prix Final.

Competitions
The locations of the JGP events change yearly. In the 2009–10 season, the series was composed of the following events:

For the second time, the Junior Grand Prix Final was held in conjunction with the senior Grand Prix Final.

Qualifying
Skaters who reached the age of 13 by July 1, 2009 but had not turned 19 (singles and females of the other two disciplines) or 21 (male pair skaters and ice dancers) were eligible to compete on the junior circuit. Unlike the senior ISU Grand Prix of Figure Skating, skaters for the Junior Grand Prix are entered by their national federations rather than seeded by the ISU. The number of entries allotted to each ISU member federation is determined by their skaters' placements at the previous season's World Junior Figure Skating Championships in each respective discipline.

For the 2009–2010 season, in singles, the three best placed member nations at the 2009 World Junior Figure Skating Championships were allowed to enter two skaters in all seven events. Member nations who placed fourth through sixth were allowed to enter one skater in all seven events. Member nations who placed seventh through twelfth were allowed to enter one skater in six of the seven events. Member nations with a skater who had qualified for the free skate at the World Junior Championships were allowed to enter one skater in five of the events. Member nations who did not qualify for the free skate but placed 25th through 30th in the short program were allowed to enter one skater in four of the events. Member nations who did not qualify for the free skate but placed 31st and lower were allowed to enter one skater in three of the events. Member nations who had not participated in the 2009 World Junior Championships were allowed to enter one skater in two events. There were provisions for additional entries per member country if another country did not use all of its allotted entries.

In pairs, member nations who placed in the top five at the 2009 World Junior Championships were allowed to enter three entries in all four events in which pairs will be contested. Member nations who qualified for the free skate at the World Junior Championships were allowed to enter two entries in all four events. All other member nations were allowed to enter one entry in all four events. The host nation was allowed to enter as many pair teams as it wanted.

In ice dance, the multiple spots allowance was the same as for singles.

The host country was allowed to enter up to three skaters/teams in singles and dance in their event, and there was no limit to the number of pairs teams.

The general spots allowance for the 2009-2010 Junior Grand Prix events was as follows:

All other member nations had one entry per discipline in two of the seven events in singles and ice dance and one entry in all four events in pairs.

Prize money
The total prize money for the Junior Grand Prix events in the 2009/2010 season was $22,500. Pairs and dance teams split the money. Everything is in US dollars. The breakdown is as follows:

The total prize money for the Junior Grand Prix Final in the 2009–2010 season was $105,000. Pairs and dance teams split the money. Everything is in US dollars. The breakdown is as follows:

Junior Grand Prix Final qualifiers
The following skaters have qualified for the 2009–2010 Junior Grand Prix Final, in order of qualification.

Medalists

Men

Ladies

Pairs

Ice dance

Medals table
The following is the table of total medals earned by each country on the 2009–2010 Junior Grand Prix. It can be sorted by country name, number of gold medals, number of silver medals, number of bronze medals, and total medals overall. The table is numbered by number of total medals.

References

External links
 International Skating Union: ISU Junior Grand Prix
 Official Site: Junior Grand Prix Torun, Poland
 Official Site: Junior Grand Prix Dresden, Germany
 Official Site: Junior Grand Prix Zagreb, Croatia
 Official Site: Junior Grand Prix Istanbul, Turkey
 
 
 
 
 
 
 
 

2009-2010
Junior Grand Prix
2009 in youth sport
2010 in youth sport